Ray Cote (born May 31, 1961) is a former professional ice hockey forward.  He spent his junior career with the Calgary Wranglers of the WHL, and signed a free agent contract with the Edmonton Oilers in 1981 after going undrafted.  Cote spent the majority of his career in the minor leagues and European leagues, but saw three separate stints with the Oilers.  His only career NHL points were recorded in the 1982–83 playoffs.  In the 1983 playoffs, he and George McPhee of the New York Rangers became the first players to score three goals in a single postseason prior to playing a regular season NHL game.  He also played for the Canadian National Team on four separate occasions.

Career statistics

References

External links 

1961 births
Adirondack Red Wings players
Adler Mannheim players
Billings Bighorns players
Calgary Wranglers (WHL) players
Canadian ice hockey centres
Edmonton Oilers players
Genève-Servette HC players
HC Davos players
Ice hockey people from Alberta
Living people
Moncton Alpines (AHL) players
Nova Scotia Oilers players
People from the Municipal District of Pincher Creek No. 9
Schwenninger Wild Wings players
SC Herisau players
Undrafted National Hockey League players
Wichita Wind players
Wiener EV players
Canadian expatriate ice hockey players in Germany
Canadian expatriate ice hockey players in Switzerland